Philipp Georg Friedrich von Reck (1710–1798) was a Freiherr of Hanover who after making two journeys to the Colony of Georgia in 1730s joined the Hanover and Danish civil service.

Biography 
Von Reck was born into nobility and held a land charter for 500 acres in America under certain contingencies of qualification. He accompanied the Salzburger Emigrants, German-speaking Lutheran settlers who were expelled from the Catholic principality of Salzburg, on their relocation voyage to Ebenezer, Georgia. He became a part of the first and third transports of the Salzburgers being responsible for secular affairs. Von Reck was described by his contemporaries as charming and enthusiastic but totally inexperienced young commissary. He was stripped of his responsibilities after repeated disputes with Johann Martin Boltzius and the competing commissary Jean Vat.

After the first voyage, von Reck left Georgia with vivid utopian descriptions of what he experienced. He wrote about Native Americans with great sympathy: His journal was published in 1734 in German and English. He came back to Ebenezer on February 7, 1736 with the third transport of which he was in charge. Ultimately, Von Reck never formalized his land claim and returned to Europe where he entered the Hanover and later Danish civil service.

Von Reck not only kept a journal of his time in America but also made his own drawings. However, the drawings and watercolor sketches were made public only in 1977 after they were discovered at the Royal Library in Copenhagen. They show his encounters with indigenous people, nature and wildlife in America. These images and journal are considered important source for the study of the Creek and especially Yuchi indigenous societies during the period of Von Reck's travels to America.

References

External links 
 
 Philipp von Reck's scetchbook, Det Kongelige Bibliotek, Danmarks 
 Philipp Georg Friedrich von Reck: 18th Century German Artist in Georgia, Ahalenia: Native American Art, History, Writing, Theory, and Practice

1710 births
1798 deaths
German Lutherans
Barons of Germany
Georgia Salzburgers